Brad Baker may refer to:

 Brad Baker (baseball) (born 1980), American baseball pitcher
 Brad Baker (motorcyclist) (born 1993), American motorcycle racer
 Brad Baker (racing driver) (born 1974), American racing driver